Baillie Gifford & Co is an investment management firm which is wholly owned by partners, all of whom work within the firm. It was founded in Edinburgh, Scotland, in 1908 and still has its headquarters in the city. It has corporate offices in New York and London.

History
Baillie & Gifford WS was formed in 1907 as a partnership between Colonel Augustus Baillie and Carlyle Gifford. Initially, it was a law firm but the financial climate of the time led to the business switching its emphasis to investment in 1908. In 1909, Baillie & Gifford created the Straits Mortgage and Trust Company Limited to lend money to rubber planters in Malaya and Ceylon.

The Straits Mortgage and Trust Company Limited was renamed The Scottish Mortgage and Trust Limited in 1913, and this was followed by the introduction of several other investment trusts. Baillie Gifford’s clients and staff emerged relatively unscathed from the First World War, and the ‘Roaring Twenties’ gave Gifford many opportunities to expand the firm’s investment business. By 1927, the transition of Baillie & Gifford WS from a firm of solicitors conducting institutional investment business to a partnership managing investment trusts was completed with the creation of Baillie Gifford & Co.

Baillie Gifford took over the management of Monks Investment Trust and two other related companies in 1931. The firm continued to grow steadily until the outbreak of the Second World War.

Baillie died in 1939 and, the following year, Gifford was posted to New York on UK Government business. However, the firm survived the war and the troubled investment climate which followed. After a period of strong growth in the firm’s staff and client base, Gifford retired in 1965 at the age of 84. Baillie Gifford emerged from a further period of economic weakness in the UK during the 1970s with its position enhanced by growth in the amount of money it managed on behalf of clients.

Assets under management continued to grow strongly during the 1990s. The firm altered the management structure when it reverted to having joint senior partners.

By the time of its centenary in 2008, Baillie Gifford had offices in New York and London in addition to its headquarters in Edinburgh, and was managing more than £50 billion. Clients included five of the seven largest pension funds in the US and the firm had also attracted significant levels of business from Japan and Australia, as well as continuing to make inroads in other parts of the Far and Middle East. Baillie Gifford sponsors the Baillie Gifford Prize for non-fiction books.

In 2015 Baillie Gifford opened an office in Hong Kong under the subsidiary Baillie Gifford Asia (Hong Kong) Limited 百利亞洲(香港)有限公司.

The company launched the Baillie Gifford US Growth Trust in 2018 and, after Baillie Gifford secured the management of Witan Pacific Investment Trust plc in 2020, the latter trust announced that would change its name to the Baillie Gifford China Growth Trust. After a purchase on 31 March 2022, Baille Gifford become the largest shareholder of Ginkgo Bioworks.

See also
Investment trusts managed by Baillie Gifford:
 Baillie Gifford Japan Trust
 Baillie Gifford Shin Nippon
 Baillie Gifford US Growth Trust
 Edinburgh Worldwide Investment Trust
 Monks Investment Trust
 Pacific Horizon Investment Trust
 Scottish American Investment Company
 Scottish Mortgage Investment Trust

References

Further reading

External links
Baillie Gifford & Co Website

1908 establishments in Scotland
Companies based in Edinburgh
Financial services companies of Scotland
Investment management companies of the United Kingdom
Financial services companies established in 1908
British companies established in 1908